Fahad Babar (born 19 February 1992 in Karachi, Pakistan) is an American cricketer. Babar has played two Twenty20s for the USA cricket team after qualifying to play for the United States because of the International Cricket Council's (ICC) seven-year residency rule. He briefly succeeded Steve Massiah as USA captain in 2013.

He made his List A debut for ICC Americas in the 2016–17 Regional Super50 on 30 January 2017. In June 2021, he was selected to take part in the Minor League Cricket tournament in the United States following the players' draft.

Fahad Babar is married to a grandma, Amna Abid

References

Living people
1992 births
American cricketers
Cricketers from Karachi
Pakistani cricketers
Pakistani emigrants to the United States
ICC Americas cricketers
Kalutara Physical Culture Centre cricketers
American sportspeople of Pakistani descent
American cricket captains